The Sierra newt (Taricha sierrae) is a newt found west of the Sierra Nevada, from Shasta county to Tulare County, in California, Western North America.

Its skin produces a potent toxin.

Subspecies 
The Sierra newt was formerly regarded as a subspecies (Taricha torosa sierrae) of the California newt (Taricha torosa). In 2007 it was determined that the two represent "distinct evolutionary lineages".

Range and habitat 
Sierra newts exist primarily in between the Cascades and Sierra Nevada, because they prefer less humid climates than the rough-skinned newts. The Sierra newt migrates between aquatic and terrestrial habitats seasonally. Outside the breeding season, the newts are land-dwelling, preferring rock crevices and logs, in habitats such as forests, woodlands, and shrub-lands. However, during breeding season, the newts will migrate to aquatic regions to mate and lay eggs.

Description

Reproduction 
Reproduction occurs generally between March and early May. Typically, the adult newts will return to the pool in which they hatched between January and February. After a mating dance, the male mounts the female and rubs his chin on her nose. He then attaches a spermatophore to the substrate, which she will retrieve into her cloaca.

The egg mass released by the female contains between seven and 30 eggs, and is roughly the consistency of a thick gelatin dessert. Typically, the egg masses are attached to stream plant roots or to rocky crevices in small, pools of slow-moving water, but they have also been known to be attached to underwater rocks or leaf debris.

Adult newts will stay in the pools throughout the breeding season, and can be occasionally found well into the summer. Larvae hatch sometime in early to midsummer, depending on local water temperature. However, the typical incubation length is between 14 and 52 days, varying primarily to water temperatures.

Larvae are difficult to find in streams, as they blend in well with the sandy bottom, to which they usually stay close. After the Larvae period which usually lasts till early fall or late summer, the newt will move to terrestrial habitats till they come back to reproduce in 5 to 8 years.

Toxicity and predation 
Like other genus Taricha members, the glands in the skin of Taricha sierrae secrete the potent neurotoxin tetrodotoxin, which is hundreds of times more toxic than cyanide. This is the same toxin found in pufferfish and harlequin frogs. Researchers believe bacteria synthesize tetrodotoxin, and the animals that employ the neurotoxin acquire it through consumption of these bacteria. This neurotoxin is strong enough to kill most vertebrates, including humans. However, it is dangerous only if ingested.

Due to their toxicity, Sierra newts have few natural predators. Garter snakes are the most common, and some species have developed a genetic resistance to tetrodotoxin. The mutations in the snake's genes that conferred resistance to the toxin have resulted in a selective pressure that favors newts that produce more potent levels of toxin. Increases in newt toxicity then apply a selective pressure favoring snakes with mutations conferring even greater resistance. This evolutionary arms race has resulted in the newts producing levels of toxin far in excess of what is needed to kill any other conceivable predator.

Diet 
Earthworms, snails, slugs, woodlice, bloodworms, mosquito larvae, crickets, other invertebrates, and trout eggs are among the Sierra newt's prey. In an aquarium habitat, earthworms provide the newt with all necessary nutrients. Other natural prey items would benefit the captive newt. Pellets tend to be inappropriate for terrestrial caudates, and fish food should be avoided completely.

Conservation status 
The closely related Taricha torosa, the California newt, is currently a California Special Concern species (DFG-CSC). Some populations have been greatly reduced in southern California coastal streams due to the introduction of non-native, invasive species and human habitation. The mosquitofish (Gambusia affinis) and red swamp crayfish (Procambarus clarkii) have caused the greatest reduction in newt populations.

References

External links 

 CaliforniaHerps.com: Taricha sierrae - Sierra Newt – Sierra newt facts.
 Caudata.org: Culture of California newts (Taricha torosa) – guide to identifying species and keeping as a pet.

Newts
Amphibians of the United States
Newt
Newt
Fauna of the Sierra Nevada (United States)